Chilostoma faustina is a species of medium-sized, air-breathing land snail, a terrestrial pulmonate gastropod mollusk in the family Helicidae, the true snails.

Distribution 
This species is known to occur in:
 Ukraine

References

External links 
 http://www.animalbase.uni-goettingen.de/zooweb/servlet/AnimalBase/home/species?id=1658
 Manual of Conchology second series - Pulmonata. Volume 4. Helicidae - Volume II. page 95.

Helicidae
Gastropods described in 1835